Krila Armije (Wings of the Army) was published by the Yugoslav Air Force (Ratno Vazduhoplovstvo i Protivvazdušna Odbrana - (RV i PVO).

First published on 15 July 1948, the bi-weekly publication was printed every other Thursday. The magazine served as a reporting tool for RV i PVO soldiers, cadets, and officers.

By edict of the President of the Republic, Marshal Josip Broz - Tito, Krila Armije was awarded the Order of military merits with golden swords (II. rank).

See also
 Yugoslav People's Army

References

Aviation magazines
Eastern Bloc mass media
Magazines established in 1948
Magazines with year of disestablishment missing
Military magazines published in Yugoslavia
Yugoslav Air Force
Biweekly magazines
Defunct magazines published in Yugoslavia